The Bridge Upto Zenith is a complex of four residential skyscrapers completed in 2012 and located in Banqiao District, New Taipei City, Taiwan.

There are many leisure facilities in the complex, such as swimming pool, spa pool, steam room, KTV and so on. As of February 2021, Tower C is the sixteenth tallest in New Taipei City (after Tuntex Highrise Building.

See also 
 List of tallest buildings in Taiwan
 List of tallest buildings in New Taipei City
 Banqiao District

References

2012 establishments in Taiwan
Residential buildings completed in 2012
Residential skyscrapers in Taiwan
Skyscrapers in New Taipei
Apartment buildings in Taiwan